Attack the Block is a 2011 British science fiction comedy horror film written and directed by Joe Cornish and starring John Boyega, Jodie Whittaker and Nick Frost. It was the film debut of Cornish, Boyega and composer Steven Price.

The film centres on a teenage street gang who have to defend themselves from predatory alien invaders on a council estate in South London on Guy Fawkes Night. Released on 11 May 2011, it underperformed at the box office but received a positive critical reception, with particular praise for Cornish's direction and Boyega's performance. It also received several international accolades. A sequel is in development.

Plot
On Guy Fawkes Night, trainee nurse Samantha Adams (Jodie Whittaker) is mugged by a gang of teenage hoodlums: Pest (Alex Esmail), Dennis (Franz Drameh), Jerome (Leeon Jones), Biggz (Simon Howard) and leader Moses (John Boyega). When a meteorite falls from the sky into a nearby car, Samantha escapes. As Moses searches the wreck of the car for valuables, his face is scratched by a dog-sized alien creature. The creature runs away, but the gang chase and kill it. Hoping to gain fame and fortune, they take the dead animal to their acquaintance, cannabis dealer Ron (Nick Frost) and his boss Hi-Hatz (Jumayn Hunter), a local gang leader, who instead recruits Moses to work for him.

More objects fall from the sky. Eager to fight the creatures, the gang arm themselves and go to the nearest crash site, where they find one dead aliem, but other living aliens. However, they find these aliens are much larger and more threatening (physically, they look like an eyeless hybrid of a wolf and a gorilla , with a mouth full of glowing shark teeth) when it kills Dennis’ pet pitbull Pogo. Fleeing the aliens, the gang are intercepted by two policemen accompanying Samantha, and Moses is arrested. The aliens follow Moses and maul the unarmed officers to death, leaving Samantha and Moses trapped inside a van. Dennis reaches the vehicle and drives it away, only to crash into Hi-Hatz's car when they pass through a nearby building’s parking space. Samantha runs away while the rest of Moses's gang catch up and confront Hi-Hatz and his henchman, who accuse Moses of trying to kill Hi-Hatz in order to replace him as the local druglord. An alien arrives and kills the henchman but is killed in turn by Hi-Hatz.

The gang try to flee to Wyndham Tower, a tower block, but are attacked outside by the aliens; Biggz is forced to hide in a skip, though he is later saved by a pair of their young neighbors who manage to kill the alien. Meanwhile, Pest is bitten in the leg by an alien who breaks into their building. They discover that Samantha also lives in their building and persuade her to treat Pest's leg. An alien bursts into her apartment and Moses kills it with a samurai sword. Realizing that the group was not lying about the creatures being extraterrestrial, Samantha joins them.

The gang moves upstairs to the flat owned by Tia (Danielle Vitalis), Dimples (Paige Meade), Dionna and Gloria, believing that their security gate will keep them safe. Two aliens instead attack from outside, smashing through the windows and decapitating Dennis. Samantha kills an alien, saving Moses in the process, while Tia and Dimples manage to kill the other one by ganging up on it. The girls believe the boys to be the focus of the creatures (since they killed the first alien) and kick them out of the flat. Hi-Hatz and two more henchmen arrive and attack the gang, blaming them for the death of the first henchman, but another alien arrives and chases Hi-Hatz and the henchmen into a lift; only Hi-Hatz makes it out alive.

Making their way upstairs to Ron's weed room, the gang runs into more aliens, but using fireworks as a distraction, they manage to get through. Jerome becomes disoriented in the smoke and is killed by an alien. Entering Ron's flat, they find that Hi-Hatz is waiting for them there, who prepares to shoot Moses but he is then suddenly attacked and killed by the rest of the aliens who break in through the window. The group flee and are joined by Brewis, one of Ron's customers and a zoology student. Moses, Pest and Samantha retreat into the weed room, while Ron hides in the flat.

In the weed room, Brewis notices a luminescent stain on Moses' jacket under the ultraviolet light. Brewis theorises that the aliens are like spores, drifting through space on solar winds until they chance on a habitable planet; after landing in an area with enough food, the female lets off a strong pheromone to attract the male creatures so that they can mate and propagate their species; Moses has been carrying scent since he and the others killed the female which is how the males have always been able to find them. Moses persuades Pest to return Samantha's stolen ring and together they form a plan. As Samantha has not been stained with the alien pheromone she can to go to Moses's flat and turn on the gas oven.

Samantha successfully bypasses the aliens and turns on the gas in the flat. She leaves the tower block, and Moses, with the corpse of the small female alien strapped to his back, runs to the gas-filled apartment with all of the big male aliens following him. He throws the corpse into the apartment; with a firework he ignites the room and leaps out of the window. The resulting explosion kills all the aliens but leaves the high-rise flat in flames. Moses survives by grabbing onto a flag hanging from the balcony.

In the aftermath, Moses, Pest, Brewis and Ron are arrested and held responsible by the arriving police for all of the recent deaths (caused by the aliens) around the block that night. The police then ask Samantha to identify Moses and his friends as those who killed everyone, including the two police officers who had arrested Moses earlier. Instead, Samantha says the boys are her neighbours and they protected her. In the back of the police van, Moses and Pest hear the residents of the block cheering for Moses; they both smile.

Cast
Representative of the film's plot and location, most of the cast (many of whom spoke Multicultural London English during the film) were young, relative unknowns and local to the area. According to the DVD's making-of featurette, the teenagers were selected from drama classes of London council estate schools and then had to go through eight auditions before being offered a part. John Boyega found out about this film from an advert placed on the internet. The cast includes:

 John Boyega as Moses, a low-level crook, teenage gang leader and orphan looking for respect around the block.
 Jodie Whittaker as Samantha Adams, a trainee nurse and new resident of Wyndham Tower.
 Alex Esmail as Pest, a teenage jokester, pyromaniac and loyal second-in-command of Moses's gang. 
 Franz Drameh as Dennis, a hotheaded pizza delivery boy and the enforcer of the gang.
 Leeon Jones as Jerome, the most level-headed member of the gang and the most academically inclined. 
 Simon Howard as Biggz, the youngest member of the gang. Throughout most of the film, Biggz is trapped in a skip (dumpster) after he is cornered by the aliens.
 Nick Frost as Ron, the local drug dealer who lives in the penthouse of Wyndham Tower and knows everyone.
 Luke Treadaway as Brewis, a posh student stoner who is one of Ron's customers.
 Jumayn Hunter as Hi-Hatz, the local psychopathic gangster who is Ron's feared boss.
 Danielle Vitalis as Tia, a girl living in Wyndham Tower who is Moses's love interest and friend to the gang.
 Paige Meade as Dimples, Tia's quick tempered roommate who is also a friend to the gang.
 Sammy Williams as Probs, a child who wishes to join Moses's gang.
 Michael Ajao as Mayhem, Probs's best friend, who shares his goal of joining Moses's gang.
 Chris Wilson as arresting Police Officer.

Production
Big Talk Pictures, known for films including Shaun of the Dead, Hot Fuzz and Scott Pilgrim vs. The World, produced the film alongside Film4, The UK Film Council and StudioCanal.

The plot was inspired by an event where the director was mugged himself, and after adding the science fiction angle into the plot, Joe Cornish interviewed various kids in youth groups in order to find out what kind of weapons they would use if a real alien invasion occurred. The director wanted to counter the trend of 'hoodie horror' films which demonised urban youths. Cornish also based the character of the stoner Brewis on himself in his twenties.

Filming
Attack the Block is set in a fictional neighbourhood said in-film to be located in the London district of Stockwell. It is actually a composite of various council estates across London. Director Cornish explains:
We wanted to stamp a clear layout on the audience's minds early on, and since we couldn't show an aerial shot of the estate as it doesn't exist, the way to show it was by showing this top shot of the map at the very beginning of the film.
The name Wyndham Tower appears on the left of the entrance to the fictional tower block, referencing the English science-fiction writer John Wyndham. (Wyndham's 1953 novel, 'The Kraken Wakes' , similarly begins with aliens invading Earth from Outer Space.) The science fiction writer J. G. Ballard is also referenced by one of the housing estate street names, Ballard Street; Ballard wrote a number of novels set in large urban tower blocks, including High-Rise where mayhem breaks out in a high-rise London apartment block.

The film was shot across London from March to May 2010, with six weeks of night shoots on the Heygate Estate in Elephant and Castle; Myatts Field, Brixton; Oval Underground station and the Bemerton Estate in Islington. Interior scenes were filmed at Three Mills Studios in Newham, part of the East End of London.

Creature effects
The creatures began with two men in gorilla-like suits with animatronic jaws; post-production added the unearthly qualities such as the spiky fur which doesn't reflect any light, the claws, the rows of bioluminescent jaws, and even some of their movement. In total the film features over 100 effects shots, which were completed over the course of 4 months by Swedish effects house Fido. The creatures have no eyes and hunt and find mates using an extremely evolved sense of smell; their movement is enabled mainly through echolocation. According to the DVD commentary, the echolocation noises made by the creatures were a combination of dolphin sonar mixed digitally with the grunts and snarls of dozens of other animals, and even a woman screaming. Some puppets were used, such as the smaller, hairless female alien which terrified the young cast.

Release

Theatrical
StudioCanal's British distribution company Optimum Releasing released the film in the United Kingdom on 11 May 2011. Sony Pictures Worldwide Acquisitions acquired the film's distribution rights for North America and Latin America, and the group opened the film in limited theatrical release in the United States on 29 July 2011 through Screen Gems. US distributors were concerned that American audiences might not understand the strong South London accents, and may have even used subtitles if it were to be released in the United States. Cornish acknowledged this during the SXSW Q and A. When he asked the audience, "Can I ask you guys something? American distributors are nervous about language, the slang" the audience said they could understand it.

Home media
The film was released on DVD and Blu-ray Disc in the United Kingdom on 19 September 2011 and in the United States on 25 October 2011. Play.com released an exclusive Blu-ray and DVD double play edition, with a glow-in-the-dark sleeve, featuring the bio-luminescent jaws of one of the creatures.

Soundtrack

The soundtrack for the film was an original score composed by British electronic music group Basement Jaxx, and Steven Price except for a few songs featured in the film but not on the soundtrack (such as the 1993 rap track "Sound of da Police" by KRS-One, and the 2006 reggae track "Youths Dem Cold" by Richie Spice, played during the end credits).

During Evan Sawdey's interview with the duo for PopMatters, he mentioned the album as an "obscure soundtrack placement that only hardcore aficionados found out about."

In 2018 I Am Shark reissued the soundtrack on a 2xLP vinyl pressing featuring exclusive written commentaries from Joe Cornish and Steven Price. The album packaging represents the monsters with glow-in-the-dark teeth on the labels and glow colored vinyl.

The original Attack the Block soundtrack by Basement Jaxx and Steven Price features the following tracks:

 "The Block"
 "Sam is Mugged"
 "Round Two Bruv"
 "It's Raining Gollums"
 "Tooling Up"
 "Moses is Arrested"
 "Tell Me I'm Dreaming"
 "Throat Ripper"
 "Rooftops"
 "Moses – Ninja"
 "Just Another Day"
 "They Want Moses"
 "Actions Have Consequences"
 "Eat My Hat"
 "They Fell Out of the Sky"
 "I Need to Finish What I Started"
 "Turn the Gas Up"
 "Moses vs. The Monsters"
 "Moses the Hero"
 "The Ends"
A rap song called "Get That Snitch", original to the film and rapped by the character Hi-Hatz, is featured at various times in the film. The full song was featured on the DVD special features.

The score and soundtrack album was mixed by Gareth Cousins.

Reception

Box office
On its opening theatrical weekend in the United Kingdom in May 2011, Attack the Block garnered £1,133,859, putting it in third place only slightly behind American blockbusters Thor and Fast Five; also in the opening weekend Attack the Block had the highest cinema site average by almost twice of the other films. On a screen-by-screen basis, Attack the Block was the week's strongest performer. In North America, the film's theatrical run began in July 2011 and was a box office flop despite receiving overall good reviews. Its theatrical run began in July 2011 and, in limited release for less than two months with 66 cinemas at its peak, it managed to gross $1,024,175 (£659,040) in North America.

Critical response
Attack the Block received acclaim from critics. Review aggregation Rotten Tomatoes gives the film a score of 90% based on 183 reviews, with an average rating of 7.5/10. The site's critical consensus reads, "Effortlessly mixing scares, laughs, and social commentary, Attack the Block is a thrilling, briskly-paced sci-fi yarn with a distinctly British flavor." On Metacritic, the film has a score of 75 out of 100, based on 27 critics, indicating "generally favorable reviews".

The website Slash film lists Attack the Block as a "true cult classic" deserving of its own action figures. In his review, Chicago Sun-Times critic Roger Ebert praised the film's use of character development and the performance given by Boyega. Scott Wampler of The Examiner rated it A+ and said it was officially the best film of the 2011 film festival season and likened it to other debuts such as Neill Blomkamp's District 9 and Quentin Tarantino's Reservoir Dogs. Matt Patches writing for Cinemablend said "Attack the Block, even on its small scale, may wind up as one of the best action movies of the year". Christ Tilly at IGN gave it four stars saying "Cornish directs with the confidence of a seasoned pro" and calling the film "a blast from start-to-finish." Ben Rawson-Jones of Digital Spy awarded the movie four stars, saying that it is "exactly the kind of distinctly homegrown product that the British film industry should be making". Mark Kermode gave a mixed review saying he did not dislike the film, but "wanted it to be funnier" and "needed it to be scarier".

Attack the Block was revisited by critics following the casting of its two lead actors as stars of flagship science fiction franchises – Boyega as Finn in Star Wars and Whittaker as the Thirteenth Doctor in Doctor Who. In a 2017 retrospective, Tom Philip writing for GQ described the film as "one of the most confidently-delivered debut feature films in recent memory" and said it "still stands out as one of the best genre-mashup films of the decade", while Nathan Rabin for Rotten Tomatoes said that the film deserved cult status and called it "a star-making vehicle in the truest sense". It was listed among Wired Magazines best films of the 2010s.

Accolades

 Audience Award for Best Film (Midnights) at SXSW 2011
 Audience Award for Best Narrative Feature at the Los Angeles Film Festival
 Audience Award for Best European or American Feature at the 2011 Fantasia Festival
 Melies d'Argent for Best European Fantastic Feature Film 2011 at the Lund International Fantastic Film Festival
 Muut Award for Best Visual Concept at the 2011 Miskolc International Film Festival
 Bassan Arts and Crafts Award for Best Production Design at the Torino Film Festival 2011
 Golden Mouse Online Critics Award for Best Film at the Torino Film Festival 2011
 Best Debut Director at the 2011 New York Film Critics Online Awards
 Best First Feature at the 2011 Toronto Film Critics Association Awards
 Best Original Soundtrack at the 2011 Sitges Film Festival
 Special Jury Award at the 2011 Sitges Film Festival
 Audience Award for Best Motion Picture at the 2011 Sitges Film Festival
 Jose Luis Guarner Critic Award at the 2011 Sitges Film Festival
 Special Mention at the 2011 Black Film Critics Circle Awards: "Attack The Block is a genre film that defies a number of conventions, not only by having a primarily black cast but portraying each character with a dignity seldom seen on screen and even more rarely in a Science-Fiction film."
 Best First Film at the 2011 Austin Film Critics Association Awards
 Best Original Score at the 2011 Austin Film Critics Association Awards
 Best Actor to John Boyega at the 2011 Black Reel Awards
 Outstanding Foreign Film at the 2011 Black Reel Awards

Sequel
In May 2021, it was announced that Cornish would be writing and directing a sequel, with Boyega set to reprise his role and produce.

References

External links
 
 
 
 

2011 films
2010s science fiction comedy films
2011 comedy horror films
2010s science fiction horror films
British action comedy films
British science fiction films
British comedy horror films
British coming-of-age films
British independent films
American action comedy films
American science fiction films
American comedy horror films
American coming-of-age films
American independent films
2011 directorial debut films
Alien invasions in films
Black British cinema
Black British mass media
Black British films
Films about drugs
Films about extraterrestrial life
Films set in apartment buildings
Films set in London
Films shot in London
Hood films
2010s monster movies
British science fiction action films
Big Talk Productions films
Film4 Productions films
StudioCanal films
Screen Gems films
Stage 6 Films films
Films with screenplays by Joe Cornish
Films scored by Steven Price
British monster movies
American monster movies
2010s English-language films
2010s American films
2010s British films